Houston Toros were an American soccer team, founded in 2002, who were members of the United Soccer Leagues Premier Development League (PDL), the fourth tier of the American Soccer Pyramid, until 2003, after which the team left the league and the franchise was terminated. The Houston Toros returned as a brand in 2010 and is partnered with Link International Design

They played their home games primarily in the stadium at North Shore Senior High School in the city of Houston, Texas.

Year-by-year

Competition History

Coaches

Stadia
 Stadium at North Shore Senior High School, Houston, Texas 2003
 Freedom World Ranch, Houston, Texas 2003 (1 game)
 Mustang Soccer Complex, Houston, Texas  2003 (1 game)

References

T
Defunct Premier Development League teams
2002 establishments in Texas
2003 disestablishments in Texas